Parachronistis is a genus of moths in the family Gelechiidae.

Species
Parachronistis albiceps (Zeller, 1839)
Parachronistis destillans (Meyrick, 1918)
Parachronistis fumea Omelko, 1986
Parachronistis geniculella Park, 1989
Parachronistis jiriensis Park, 1985
Parachronistis maritima Omelko, 1986
Parachronistis sellaris Park, 1985

References

 
Litini
Moth genera